Zahra Pourheidar (born 15 April 1994) is an Iranian footballer who plays as a defender for Kowsar Women Football League club Sepahan SC and the senior Iran women's national team.

References 

1994 births
Living people
Iranian women's footballers
Iran women's international footballers
Women's association football defenders
People from Chaharmahal and Bakhtiari Province
21st-century Iranian women